is a Japanese visual novel video game developed by Kemco and released on December 3, 2015 for iOS and Android smartphones. It was later ported to the PlayStation Vita, PlayStation 4 and Nintendo Switch consoles and Microsoft Windows. An English version was released in late 2019 on PlayStation 4, Nintendo Switch and Windows. On April 22, 2021, an English version was released for Android devices.

Gameplay
Raging Loop is an interactive visual novel with a branching plotline, in which the player's choices affect the direction of the story. Certain choices reward the player with keys, which can be used to unlock additional choices and explore more of the story. A Scenario Chart allows the player to return to any given scene or choice. There are four main endings, as well as many bad endings, some of which are optional. While the player has some freedom to explore different paths, the main endings must be played in a linear order due to the locked choices.

Many of the game's choices are at key moments in the Feast of the Yomi-Purge, a Werewolf-like social deduction game in which characters attempt to find the identities of the "wolves" hidden among them.

Clearing the fourth and final ending unlocks "Revelation Mode," which allows players to replay the story with additional content. Revelation Mode includes side characters' internal thoughts, additional narration, and scenes that occur outside the protagonist's perspective, such as the wolves' actions. Along with Revelation Mode, two additional endings and five epilogues become available.

Plot
On a trip from Tokyo, Haruaki Fusaishi crashes his bike into the remote mountain village of Yasumizu, where he befriends college student Chiemi Serizawa. Before he can leave, Yasumizu is enshrouded by mist, and everyone in town must begin the Feast of the Yomi-Purge, an event in which several villagers become "wolves" and must kill one person each night. During the day, the villagers share information and vote to hang someone to eliminate the wolves. According to legend, the wolves are yomibito risen from the dead, and must be purged.

As the Feast continues, Haruaki discovers his ability to loop back in time after death, returning to the day he entered the village and repeating his actions. Unable to escape the loop, Haruaki relies on his memories, in the hopes of learning the truth about the Feast's origin, Yasumizu's secrets, and the truth behind the looping.

In one route, Haruaki bonds with Chiemi and learns her fear of God and the supernatural corruption plaguing Yasumizu. The wolves win the Feast and reveal that the mountain god Shin'nai told them the humans are the true yomibito who need to be saved. Haruaki and Chiemi attempt to run away, but they are unable to escape and Chiemi rots away into the mist.

In another route, Haruaki gains the role of the "snake," allowing him to learn whether someone is a wolf or human each night. His deductions lead the humans to victory over the wolves. During the Feast, he grows close to Rikako Uematsu, a mysterious priestess with the power to heal others by taking in their corruption. Haruaki plans to start a new life with her after the Feast ends, but the remaining villagers are suddenly massacred and Haruaki loops back once again.

In the third route, Haruaki becomes a wolf and learns the inner workings of the Feast. He gets to know his fellow wolf Haru Makishima, a girl who lost her parents in a previous Feast eight years prior. Haru is possessed by a god named Mujina, who is aware of Haruaki's looping ability. By questioning her, Haruaki learns more about Yasumizu's gods. Haruaki ultimately wins the Feast, and a monstrous being appears in the sky. Haruaki is greeted by a sheep who explains to him that he is within someone else's dream, and the dreamer is resetting time to awaken the being. The sheep tells him it has been allowing Haruaki to keep his memories, and sends him back in time to prevent the country's destruction.

Haruaki reconvenes with Chiemi and realizes that she also remembers each time loop. Together, they make numerous attempts to escape the mists and change the events of the Feast, but they remain trapped. Haruaki returns to a number of key points in previous Feasts to speak with other villagers, and begins to understand the truth: the Feast is a man-made game devised by the Miguruma clan, a powerful family in the neighboring village of Fujiyoshi. The Migurumas would ostracize certain people and send them to live in Yasumizu, and fabricated their legends and culture to keep the villagers dedicated to purging yomibito.

Haruaki visits the sheep once more, and asks to be sent back as far as possible. Armed with his knowledge, he returns to Yasumizu and poses as a god, asking the villagers to stop the Feast, and restoring their faith in Mujina. He confronts Rikako, the dreamer responsible for looping time. She reveals that she wanted all the villagers to die in the Feast to revive the Tsuchigumo of Dreams, the being that appeared after Haruaki won the Feast as a wolf. With her plans thwarted, Rikako discovers she can no longer reset time with her death. Lastly, Haruaki confronts the Migurumas and puts an end to their control over Yasumizu.

Haruaki leaves Yasumizu and returns to his normal life, considering the events in Yasumizu to be a dream. However, he is later visited by Chiemi, who asks him to take her out on the bike ride he promised her when they first met. Haruaki agrees, and they set out on their trip.

Main characters

The main character who arrives in Yasumizu to solve the mysteries behind the feast and the supernatural elements of the village. He has the ability to loop to different timelines, which is essentially the player using the scenario chart to jump to different choices in the game. As Haruaki loops to a new timeline, his memories are stored within 20 different keys scattered throughout the game. 

A 21-year old college student. She has a cheerful attitude which makes her the favorite among locals in Yasumizu.

A resident of Yasumizu and the last remaining member of the Uematsu family. Haruaki's first impression of her is of a beautiful yet mysterious lady. 

A student resident of Yasumizu and Kanzo's grand-daughter. She has a "illness" which was thought to be a wolf's possession, but it is actually more sinister.

A student resident of Yasumizu. He is the first son of Kaori and the older brother of Yoshitsugu. He is among the smartest in Yasumizu, and even the village elders listen to him when he is talking.

A student resident of Yasumizu who possesses high intuition. He talks and dresses strangely, but still people consider him intelligent despite having bad grades in school.

A resident of Yasumizu. He is the leader among young adults in Yasumizu. He also managees the farmlands in Yasumizu.

A resident of Yasumizu who typically heads the dining hall. She is the mother of Yasunaga and Yoshitsugu. 

Yasunaga's delinquent younger brother. He is the 2nd son of Kaori and a student and a resident of Yasumizu.

A Yasumizu elder. 

A Yasumizu elder and Haru's grandfather. He is in charge of hunting for the village. Every morning, he also patrols the entire village for wolves or other dangers.

A rich resident doctor of Yasumizu. He is usually viewed as a jerk among the villagers. Incredibly protective of Rikako.

A seemingly senile old man. His background is mysterious. 

A lost little girl with no name or memories of her past. She is called Meiko due to her tendency to say "mei", with the female pronoun "ko" added in the end. 

A journalist specializing in foreign and exotic foods. During her amateur writing years, she specialized in the occult. Haruaki describes her as very beautiful.

A professional photographer from Tokyo. His giant stature makes him intimidating to look at.

A Convenience store clerk.

Music
SweepRecord released an Original Soundtrack CD in late 2018.

Reception

Raging Loop was well received by critics, according to the review aggregator Metacritic.

Adaptations

A  was published on March 30, 2018.

Manga
A 128-page manga anthology was published on April 12, 2019.

Novelization
A 7-volume novelization by the original author was released from April 15, 2019 to October 15, 2019.

References

External links
 Kemco's official Raging Loop website 
 PQube's official Raging Loop website
 

2015 video games
Android (operating system) games
Kemco games
Light novels
Nintendo Switch games
PlayStation 4 games
PlayStation Vita games
PQube games
Single-player video games
Social deduction video games
Video games about time loops
Video games developed in Japan 
Video games with alternate endings
Visual novels
Windows games